"Leão do Mar" ("Lion of the Sea") is a hymn of Santos FC. It was commissioned in 1955 to celebrate the club's second Campeonato Paulista, and their first in 20 years. The words were written by Mangeri Neto and the music was composed by Mangeri Sobrinho.

Although the anthem is not officially recognized, it is highly regarded as the de facto anthem of Santos, played during television coverages, goals and title commemorations. Both players and fans have publicly pushed for the recognition of the hymn by the club.

Hymn lyrics  
 Original version in Portuguese language(and English translation):
Santos!! Santos!! Gol!!  (Santos! Santos! Goal!)

Agora quem dá bola é o Santos,  (Now Santos controls the ball,) 
O Santos é o novo campeão,  (Santos is the new champion,)
Glorioso alvinegro praiano,  (Glorious black-and-white from the beach,)
Campeão absoluto desse ano!,  (Absolute champion this year!)

Agora quem dá bola é o Santos,  (Now Santos controls the ball,) 
O Santos é o novo campeão,  (Santos is the new champion,)
Glorioso alvinegro praiano,  (Glorious black-and-white from the beach,)
Campeão absoluto desse ano!,  (Absolute champion this year!)

Santos!!  (Santos!!)

Santos sempre Santos,  (Santos, always Santos,)
Dentro ou fora do alçapão,  (Be it home or away,)
Jogue o que jogar,  (However well you play,)
És o leão do mar,  (You're the lion of the sea,)
Salve o nosso campeão!!!,  (Hail to our champion!)

Agora quem dá bola é o Santos,  (Now Santos controls the ball,) 
O Santos é o novo campeão,  (Santos is the new champion,)
Glorioso alvinegro praiano,  (Glorious black-and-white from the beach,)
Campeão absoluto desse ano!,  (Absolute champion this year!)

Santos!!  (Santos!!)

Santos sempre Santos,  (Santos, always Santos,)
Dentro ou fora do alçapão,  (Be it home or away,)
Jogue o que jogar,  (However well you play,)
És o leão do mar,  (You're the lion of the sea,)
Salve o nosso campeão!!!,  (Hail to our champion!)

References

External links

Leão do Mar on Santos' Official Site

Brazilian songs
Santos FC
Association football songs and chants
Portuguese-language songs
1955 songs